Coscinium is a genus of flowering plants in the family Menispermaceae.

References

External links
 
 

Menispermaceae
Menispermaceae genera